Masu can refer to:

Places
 Masu, Iran, a village in West Azerbaijan Province, Iran
 Masu, Nigeria, a town in Sokoto State, Nigeria
 Masu Bhurgri, union council in the Sindh province of Pakistan
 The other name of Wanli District, a district in New Taipei, Taiwan

Surname
Leonardo Masu (born 1934), Italian Olympics weightlifter
Nozomi Masu (born 1980), Japanese voice actress
Takeshi Masu (born 1955), Japanese actor

Abbreviations
 MASU, Medical Assessment Unit in a hospital
 MaSu, an occasional abbreviation of the musical group Machinae Supremacy

Other
 Masu (measurement), a traditional wooden or origami box
 Masu, a plant, Hedysarum alpinum, whose edible root is consumed by the Inuit of Alaska
 Masu salmon or cherry salmon, a species of salmon or trout of the North-West Pacific region